The 1924 Buffalo Bisons football team represented the University of Buffalo as an independent during the 1924 college football season. Led by Russell Carrick in his first season as head coach, the team compiled a record of 1–7.

Schedule

References

Buffalo
Buffalo Bulls football seasons
Buffalo Bison football